Seller is a surname. Notable people with the surname include:

Abednego Seller (1646?–1705), English writer
Chris Seller (born 1977), Canadian lacrosse player
Jeffrey Seller, American theatrical producer
Wolf Dieter Seller, German canoeist

See also
Sellar
Sellers (surname)